Sio may refer to:

Places
 Sió, an artificial channel in Hungary
 Siø, a small Danish island in the South Funen Archipelago
 Sio, Burkina Faso, a village in Burkina Faso
 Sio, Mali, a commune in Mali
 Sio, Papua New Guinea, a town in Papua New Guinea
 Sio, a river in Western Africa providing water for the Lake Togo
 Smithton Airport (IATA airport code), Tasmania, Australia

Computing
 SIO (software), a serial port driver for the OS/2 operating system
 Atari SIO, a peripheral bus
 Super I/O, a motherboard chipset component
 Start I/O (SIO) instruction on IBM S/360 or S/370.

Organizations
 Scripps Institution of Oceanography, La Jolla, California, U.S.
 Students Islamic Organisation of India
 Foundation for Student Life in Oslo (Studentsamskipnaden i Oslo)
 Sexarbejdernes Interesse Organisation, a Nordic organization of sex workers (see Prostitution in Sweden)

People
 Sio (cartoonist), Italian comics artist
 William Sio (born 1960), New Zealand politician
 David Sio (born 1962), Samoan rugby union footballer
 Giovanni Sio (born 1989), Ivorian international footballer
 Ken Sio (born 1990), Australian rugby league player
 Michael Sio (born 1993), New Zealand rugby league player

Other uses
 Battle of Sio, part of the New Guinea campaign of World War II
 ISO 639:sio or Siouan, a language family of North America
 Sio language, an Austronesian language
 Sio (genus), a genus of fish
 SiO, the chemical formula for Silicon monoxide
 SiO2, the chemical formula for Silicon dioxide
 Senior Investigating Officer, the lead officer in a criminal investigation in the U.K.

See also
 De Sio, a surname